Judge Singleton may refer to:

John Virgil Singleton Jr. (1918–2015), judge of the United States District Court for the Southern District of Texas
James K. Singleton (born 1939), judge of the United States District Court for the District of Alaska